This list of mobile app distribution platforms includes digital distribution platforms, or marketplace 'app stores', that are intended to provide mobile applications, aka 'apps' to mobile devices.  For information on each mobile platform and its market share, see the mobile operating system and smartphone articles.  A comparison of development capabilities of each mobile platform can be found in the article mobile app development.  For cross-platform development, see mobile development framework.  The mobile software article contains other general information.

Mobile app platforms

Native platforms
These application marketplaces, or 'm' are native to the major mobile operating systems.

There are  native mobile app distribution platforms currently on this list. 

Notes

Third-party platforms
Third-party platforms are software distribution platforms which are used as alternatives for operating system native distribution platforms. Independent operating systems are software collections which use their own software distribution, customised user interface (UI), software development kit (SDK) and application programming interface (API) (except billing API which is related only to application store).

There are  third-party mobile app distribution platforms currently on this list.

Introduction of mobile app distribution platforms 
Mobile app distribution platforms are online marketplaces where developers can upload and distribute their mobile apps to millions of users worldwide. These platforms serve as a bridge between developers and users, providing a centralized location where users can discover and [./Https://appliteapps.com/best-android-apps/ download new apps], and developers can reach a wider audience. Mobile app distribution platforms are essential for app developers, as they offer a convenient and efficient way to promote and distribute their apps to a large number of potential users. 

They also provide a range of tools and services that can help developers to monetize their apps, such as in-app advertising and in-app purchases. Overall, mobile app distribution platforms play a critical role in the mobile app ecosystem, facilitating the growth and success of the industry as a whole.

List of most popular mobile app distribution platforms 
There are many mobile app distribution platforms available for developers to distribute their mobile apps to users. Some of the most popular 10 mobile app distribution platforms are:

 Apple App Store: This is the official app store for iOS devices. It is the primary distribution platform for iOS apps and has strict guidelines for app approval.
 Google Play Store: This is the official app store for Android devices. It is the primary distribution platform for Android apps and has more relaxed guidelines for app approval.
 Amazon Appstore: This is an app store by Amazon and is available on Kindle Fire and Android devices. Developers can distribute their apps to millions of Amazon customers.
 Samsung Galaxy Store: This is an app store by Samsung and is available on Samsung devices. Developers can distribute their apps to millions of Samsung customers.
 Huawei App Gallery: This is an app store by Huawei and is available on Huawei and Honor devices. Developers can distribute their apps to millions of Huawei customers.
 Microsoft Store: This is an app store by Microsoft and is available on Windows devices. Developers can distribute their apps to millions of Microsoft customers.
 Aptoide: This is an independent app store for Android devices. Developers can distribute their apps to millions of Aptoide users.
 F-Droid: This is an open-source app store for Android devices. Developers can distribute their open-source apps to millions of F-Droid users.
 GetJar: This is an independent app store for Android devices. Developers can distribute their apps to millions of GetJar users.
 SlideME: This is an independent app store for Android devices. Developers can distribute their apps to millions of SlideME users.

Each of these platforms has its guidelines, revenue models, and user bases. Developers need to choose the right platform(s) for their apps based on their target audience and business objectives.

See also

Cloud gaming
Mobile application management
Mobile content management system
Mobile device management
List of Mobile Device Management software
Mobile security
Over-the-air programming

References

Device platform references

 
 
 
 
 
Mobile telecommunications
Computing-related lists
Internet-related lists